Guillermo Heredia may refer to:

 Ángel Guillermo Heredia Hernández (born 1975), Mexican discus thrower, drug dealer and sports coach
 Guillermo Heredia (baseball) (born 1991), Cuban baseball outfielder